Castle Rock v. Gonzales, 545 U.S. 748 (2005), is a United States Supreme Court case in which the Court ruled, 7–2, that a town and its police department could not be sued under 42 U.S.C. § 1983 for failing to enforce a  restraining order, which had led to the murders of a woman's three children by her estranged husband. The decision has since become infamous and condemned by several human rights groups.

Background synopsis

Restraining order and police inaction 
During divorce proceedings, Jessica Lenahan-Gonzales, a resident of Castle Rock, Colorado, obtained a permanent restraining order against her husband Simon, who had been stalking her, on June 4, 1999, requiring him to remain at least  from her and her four children (son Jesse, who is not Simon's biological child, and daughters Rebecca, Katheryn, and Leslie) except during specified visitation time.  On June 22, at approximately 5:15 pm, Simon took possession of the three girls in violation of the order. Jessica called the police at approximately 7:30 pm, 8:30 pm, and 10:10 pm on June 22, and 12:15 am on June 23, and visited the police station in person at 12:40 am on June 23. Prior to the second call, Simon had called Jessica and stated that he had the daughters with him at an amusement park in Denver, Colorado. However, since Jessica had allowed Simon, from time to time, to take the children at various hours, the police took no action. At approximately 3:20 am on June 23, Simon appeared at the Castle Rock police station and was killed in a shoot-out with the officers. A search of his vehicle revealed the dead bodies of the three daughters, who were determined to have been killed prior to arrival at the police station. There was no cause of death found, nor was there a time or place of death.

United States District Court for the District of Colorado
Gonzales filed suit in the United States District Court for the District of Colorado against Castle Rock, Colorado, its police department, and the three individual police officers with whom she had spoken under 42 U.S.C. § 1983, claiming a federally protected property interest in enforcement of the restraining order and alleging "an official policy or custom of failing to respond properly to complaints of restraining order violations."  A motion to dismiss the case was granted, and Gonzales appealed to the Denver, Colorado Tenth Circuit Court of Appeals. A panel of that court rejected Gonzales's substantive due process claim but found a procedural due process claim; an en banc rehearing reached the same conclusion. The court also affirmed the finding that the three individual officers had qualified immunity and as such could not be sued.

Opinion of the Court 
The Supreme Court reversed the Tenth Circuit's decision, reinstating the District Court's order of dismissal.  The Court's majority opinion by Justice Antonin Scalia held that enforcement of the restraining order was not mandatory under Colorado law; were a mandate for enforcement to exist, it would not create an individual right to enforcement that could be considered a protected entitlement under the precedent of Board of Regents of State Colleges v. Roth; and even if there were a protected individual entitlement to enforcement of a restraining order, such entitlement would have no monetary value and hence would not count as property for the Due Process Clause.

Justice David Souter wrote a concurring opinion, using the reasoning that enforcement of a restraining order is a process, not the interest protected by the process, and that there is not due process protection for processes.

Stevens' dissent 
Justice John Paul Stevens wrote a dissenting opinion, in which he wrote that with respect to whether or not an arrest was mandatory under Colorado law, the court should either have deferred to the 10th Circuit court's finding that it was or else certified the question to the Colorado Supreme Court rather than decide the issue itself.  He went on to write that the law created a statutory guarantee of enforcement, which is an individual benefit and constitutes a protected property interest under Roth, rejecting the court's use of O'Bannon v. Town Court Nursing Center to require a monetary value and the concurrence's distinction between enforcement of the restraining order (the violator's arrest) and the benefit of enforcement (safety from the violator).

Subsequent developments

Inter-American Commission on Human Rights 
In 2011, the case came before the Inter-American Commission on Human Rights, a commission composed of representatives from the members of Organization of American States (the United States is a full member by its ratification of the charter document, which is a treaty itself) which found that "the state failed to act with due diligence to protect Jessica Lenahan and (her daughters) Leslie, Katheryn and Rebecca Gonzales from domestic violence, which violated the state’s obligation not to discriminate and to provide for equal protection before the law." The Commission also said that "the failure of the United States to adequately organize its state structure to protect [the Gonzales girls] from domestic violence was discriminatory and constituted a violation of their right to life."

Response
The National Organization for Women has argued the Supreme Court's decision reduced the utility of restraining orders and "effectively gives law enforcement a green light to ignore restraining orders."

See also
 DeShaney v. Winnebago County
 Warren v. District of Columbia
 Domestic violence
 Protective order
 Restraining order
 Refusing to assist a police officer

References

External links
 
 Jessica Lenahan (Gonzales) v. United States, a case brought by the petitioner before the Inter-American Commission for Human Rights
 Court Backs Town in Domestic Violence Case
 PBS Documentary on case October 2018 

United States civil due process case law
United States administrative case law
United States Supreme Court cases
United States Supreme Court cases of the Rehnquist Court
2005 in United States case law
American Civil Liberties Union litigation
Castle Rock, Colorado
Law enforcement in Colorado
Domestic violence in the United States